The Rockdale Run Formation is a geologic formation in Maryland, Pennsylvania, Virginia and West Virginia. It preserves fossils dating back to the Ordovician period.

See also

 List of fossiliferous stratigraphic units in Maryland
 List of fossiliferous stratigraphic units in Pennsylvania
 List of fossiliferous stratigraphic units in Virginia
 List of fossiliferous stratigraphic units in West Virginia

References

 

Ordovician System of North America
Ordovician Maryland
Ordovician geology of Virginia
Ordovician southern paleotemperate deposits
Lower Ordovician Series